The following lists events that happened during 1952 in Laos.

Incumbents
Monarch: Sisavang Vong 
Prime Minister: Souvanna Phouma

Events
date unknown - The Lao kip is introduced as the currency of Laos.

Births
17 February - Sombath Somphone

References

 
1950s in Laos
Years of the 20th century in Laos
Laos
Laos